The Babushka Lady is an unidentified woman present during the 1963 assassination of US President John F. Kennedy who might have photographed or filmed the events that occurred in Dallas's Dealey Plaza at the time President John F. Kennedy was shot. Her nickname arose from the headscarf she wore, which was similar to scarves worn by elderly Russian women  (бабушка – babushka – literally means "grandmother" or "old woman" in Russian).

The Babushka Lady was seen to be holding a camera by eyewitnesses and was also seen in film accounts of the assassination. She was observed standing on the grass between Elm and Main streets, standing amongst onlookers in front of the Dallas County Building, and is visible in the Zapruder film as well as in the films of Orville Nix, Marie Muchmore, and Mark Bell (44 minutes and 47 seconds into the Bell film: even though the shooting had already taken place and most of her surrounding witnesses took cover, she can be seen still standing with the camera at her face). After the shooting, she crossed Elm Street and joined the crowd that went up the grassy knoll. She is last seen in photographs walking east on Elm Street. Neither she, nor the film she may have taken, have ever been positively identified. Her first appearance on film chronologically is on the sidewalk in front of the Dallas County Building - visible in an image as being on JFK's right. She would have crossed Houston Street and onto Dealey Plaza in order to be visible in the Dealey Plaza images. This may imply that the images show two different women of similar appearance however it is plausible that once the motorcade passed by she was able to cross the street to catch a second motorcade drive past on Dealey Plaza where she would be on JFK's left.

Beverly Oliver's claim
In 1970, a woman named Beverly Oliver told conspiracy researcher Gary Shaw at a church revival meeting in Joshua, Texas, that she was the Babushka Lady. Oliver stated that she filmed the assassination with a Super 8 film Yashica and that she turned the undeveloped film over to two men who identified themselves to her as FBI agents. According to Oliver, she obtained no receipt from the men, who told her that they would return the film to her within ten days. She did not follow up with an inquiry. She reiterated her claims in the 1988 documentary The Men Who Killed Kennedy. According to Vincent Bugliosi, Oliver "has never proved to most people's satisfaction that she was in Dealey Plaza that day." Confronted with the fact that the Yashica Super-8 camera was not made until 1969, she stated that she received the "experimental" camera from a friend and was not even sure the manufacturer's name was on it.

Beverly Oliver's claims were the basis for a scene in Oliver Stone's 1991 film JFK, in which a character named "Beverly" meets Jim Garrison in a Dallas nightclub. Played by Lolita Davidovich, she is depicted in the director's cut as wearing a headscarf at Dealey Plaza and speaking of having given the film she shot to two men claiming to be FBI agents.

House Select Committee on Assassinations report
In March 1979, the Photographic Evidence Panel of the United States House Select Committee on Assassinations indicated that they were unable to locate any film attributed to the Babushka Lady. According to their report: "Initially, Robert Groden, a photographic consultant to the committee advised the panel as to pertinent photographic issues and related materials. Committee investigators located many of the suggested films and photographs, however, some items were never located, i.e. the Babushka Lady film, a color photograph by Norman Similas, and the original negative of the Betzner photograph."

Public hearings of the Assassination Records Review Board
On November 18, 1994, assassination researcher Gary Mack testified before the Assassination Records Review Board that he had recently been told by an executive in Kodak's Dallas office that a woman in her early 30s with brunette hair brought in film purported to be of the assassination scene while they were processing the Zapruder film. According to Mack, the executive said the woman explained to federal investigators already at the film processing office that she ran from Main Street across the grass to Elm Street where she stopped and snapped a photo with some people in the foreground of the presidential limousine and the Texas School Book Depository. Mack said that he was told by the Kodak executive that the photo was extremely blurry and "virtually useless" and indicated that the woman likely went home without anyone recording her identity. After suggesting that the woman in the story may have been the Babushka Lady, Mack then told the Board: "I do not believe that Beverly Oliver is the Babushka Lady, or, let me rephrase that, she certainly could be but the rest of the story is a fabrication."

Also appearing that same day before the ARRB as "Beverly Oliver Massegee", Oliver stated that she was 17 years old at the time of the assassination. According to Oliver, she handed over the camera because the man was an authority figure and because she feared being caught in possession of marijuana.

See also
Badge Man
Three tramps
Umbrella man (JFK assassination)

References

External links
Is Beverly Oliver the "Babushka Lady"? Marquette University.
Reitzes, Dave (October 31, 2001). The JFK 100: 100 Errors in Fact and Judgment in Oliver Stone's Assassination Movie: Beverly Oliver.

20th-century women
Unidentified people
Witnesses to the assassination of John F. Kennedy